Hélio César dos Anjos Pinto (born 7 March 1958) is a Brazilian professional football coach and former player who is in charge of Ponte Preta. 

During his playing career as a goalkeeper, he played for Flamengo, Cruzeiro and Joinville, and retired at age 28 after a hip injury.

Career 
While still acting as a player in the goalkeeper position, Helio came to play for Flamengo, between the years 1978 and 1980. At the time he was only the third goalkeeper of the cast, behind the holder Raul Plasmann and booking Cantarele. He is famous for the rigor and discipline of the players as a developer of technical talent. This characteristic of his can be seen around the clubs who trained under him, such as Juventude, Goiás, Fortaleza, Vitória, Sport, among others. He is also a businessman, member of the Construction G4.

Hélio dos Anjos has coached big clubs in Brazil, such as Grêmio, Vasco da Gama, Goiás, Sport, Atlético Paranaense, Victoria, Bahia, Fortaleza, among others. In Goiás, the club in which trained he the most games and won the most titles, he was chosen by the fans as the favorite coach in the history of Goiás. From March 2007 to June 2008, he trained the Saudi national football team, replacing compatriot Marcos Paqueta. The selection was runner-up in the Asia Cup in 2007. In 2011, he arrived at Atletico Goianiense.

Honours

Player 
 Flamengo
 Campeonato Brasileiro Série A (1): 1980
 Campeonato Carioca (2): 1978, 1979

Coach 
 Vitória
 Campeonato Baiano (1): 1992

 Remo
 Campeonato Paraense (1): 1995 (Iinvincible)

 Sport.
 Campeonato Pernambucano (3): 1996, 1997, 2003

 Goiás
 Campeonato Brasileiro Série B (1): 1999
 Campeonato Goiano (5): 1999, 2000, 2009, 2015, 2018
 Copa Centro-Oeste (1): 2000 
 Torneio Seletivo à Copa dos Campeões (1): 2000

Paysandu
 Campeonato Paraense: 2020

Náutico
 Campeonato Pernambucano: 2021

References

External links
 Official website

1958 births
Living people
Brazilian footballers
Brazilian football managers
Expatriate football managers in Saudi Arabia
Campeonato Brasileiro Série A managers
Campeonato Brasileiro Série B managers
Campeonato Brasileiro Série C managers
Saudi Professional League managers
Cruzeiro Esporte Clube players
América Futebol Clube (MG) players
CR Flamengo footballers
Joinville Esporte Clube players
Joinville Esporte Clube managers
Clube de Regatas Brasil managers
Avaí FC managers
Grêmio Esportivo Sãocarlense managers
Esporte Clube Juventude managers
Esporte Clube Vitória managers
Clube Náutico Capibaribe managers
Esporte Clube XV de Novembro (Piracicaba) managers
Club Athletico Paranaense managers
Clube do Remo managers
Goiás Esporte Clube managers
Sport Club do Recife managers
Grêmio Foot-Ball Porto Alegrense managers
América Futebol Clube (MG) managers
Guarani FC managers
CR Vasco da Gama managers
Esporte Clube Bahia managers
Fortaleza Esporte Clube managers
Saudi Arabia national football team managers
Al-Nasr SC (Dubai) managers
Vila Nova Futebol Clube managers
Atlético Clube Goianiense managers
Figueirense FC managers
Sociedade Esportiva e Recreativa Caxias do Sul managers
ABC Futebol Clube managers
Paysandu Sport Club managers
Najran SC managers
Al-Faisaly FC managers
Brazilian expatriate sportspeople in Saudi Arabia
Association football goalkeepers
Associação Atlética Ponte Preta managers